Thoroughly Modern Millie is a musical with music by Jeanine Tesori, lyrics by Dick Scanlan, and a book by Richard Morris and Scanlan. It is based on the 1967 film of the same name, which itself was based on the British musical Chrysanthemum, which opened in London in 1956. Thoroughly Modern Millie tells the story of a small-town girl, Millie Dillmount, who comes to New York City to marry for money instead of love – a thoroughly modern aim in 1922, when women were just entering the workforce. Millie soon begins to take delight in the flapper lifestyle, but problems arise when she checks into a hotel owned by the leader of a white slavery ring in China. The style of the musical is comic pastiche. Like the film on which it is based, it interpolates new tunes with some previously written songs.

After previews at the La Jolla Playhouse in San Diego, California, in October 2000, the show opened on Broadway on April 18, 2002. The production subsequently won six 2002 Tony Awards, including Best Musical. Due to the success of the original Broadway production, there was both a United States tour and a West End production launched in 2003, followed by a United Kingdom tour in 2005. The musical has since become a popular choice for high school productions,<ref name="time"> </ref> but has garnered controversy over the racial stereotyping of its Asian characters, and has been described as "a piece [that] walks the line of being entertaining and highly offensive".

Synopsis

Act I

In 1922, Millie Dillmount arrives in New York City from Salina, Kansas. Determined to become a success, she tears up her return ticket ("Not for the Life of Me"). Bobbing her hair, she assumes the modern look of a "flapper" ("Thoroughly Modern Millie"). But she is quickly mugged on the streets of New York, losing her hat, scarf, purse and a shoe. In a panic for someone to help her, she trips bypasser Jimmy Smith, a handsome, carefree young man who makes his way through life on whims and wits, who promptly lectures her on why she needs to head back home: she is just another girl full of false hopes who doesn't belong in the big city. Almost taking his advice, she changes her mind and yells after him, "Who needs a hat? Who needs a purse? And who needs YOU, mister whoever-you-are?!" and soon takes a room at the Hotel Priscilla for Single Women ("Not For the Life of Me [reprise]").

A week later, Millie is confronted by the hotel proprietress, the mysterious and sinister Mrs. Meers, a former actress who now works for a white slavery ring in Hong Kong, kidnapping pretty unsuspecting orphan girls and shipping them to the Orient, which she has just done to Millie's hall mate, Ethel Peas. Mrs. Meers declares that Millie "has two minutes to pack, or find her things on the street!" But then Millie meets the wealthy Miss Dorothy, who wants to learn how the poorer half lives ("How the Other Half Lives"), and wants a room in the Hotel Priscilla. Millie, seeing this as a way to get her rent paid, suggests that Miss Dorothy can room with her until she can find her own, but only if Miss Dorothy pays the rent.  Mrs. Meers comes out of her office, saying Millie can get a rent extension, and Miss Dorothy can take the "nice, sunny room that just become available, right next to Millie's." When Millie asks what happened to her old neighbor, Ethel, Mrs. Meers says she got an acting job in the Orient. Millie and Miss Dorothy then go up to their rooms, tap dancing to get the elevator to start.

In the Hotel Priscilla laundry room, two Chinese immigrants, Ching Ho and Bun Foo, are working for Mrs. Meers to earn enough money to bring their mother from Hong Kong over to the states ("Not for the Life of Me [reprise]").

After researching some of the richest and most eligible bachelors in the world, Millie comes to Sincere Trust not only looking for a job, but also to set her sights on the company's boss, Trevor Graydon III ("The Speed Test"). Her lightning speed stenography easily lands her the job. Meanwhile, Ching Ho attempts to capture Miss Dorothy for Mrs. Meers with a drugged apple but when he sees her, he falls in love with her instantly and wants to save her from Mrs. Meers. Before Dorothy eats the drugged apple, Millie arrives (Mrs. Meers has to act like she was getting a stain out of the carpet with "soy sauce") with the good news that she has found a job and a boss to marry. As the girls rush off to their rooms, Mrs. Meers thinks about how stupid the girls are never to realize her evil plan to ship them to Southeast Asia ("They Don't Know"). To celebrate their success the girls go to a speakeasy, where they meet Jimmy, but the club is raided by the police. While waiting for his release in the jail cell, Jimmy realizes that he loves Millie ("What Do I Need with Love").
 
Jimmy asks Millie to a party hosted by famous singer Muzzy van Hossmere, and she accepts. Before the party Muzzy sings of her love for New York ("Only in New York"). At the party, Millie spills wine on Dorothy Parker's dress, which Millie tries to get out with soy sauce, following Mrs. Meers' example. After the party, Millie explains to Jimmy how she is going to marry Trevor. She also tells him off for being a "skirt chaser" and "womanizer." As they argue, Jimmy suddenly grabs Millie and kisses her, then runs away. Millie realizes that she loves Jimmy ("Jimmy"). Millie returns to the hotel and overhears a conversation between Miss Dorothy and Jimmy, "I really want to tell her, she's my best friend" followed by "You know we can't". Millie sees Jimmy sneaking out of Miss Dorothy's room after what appears to be a late-night tryst; confused and horrified, Millie decides she never wants anything to do with Jimmy ever again.

Act II

At Sincere Trust, Millie tells the other stenographers that she is "completely over" Jimmy, then realizes she is still in love; the girls try to convince her to let him go ("Forget About the Boy"). Millie places more conviction into marrying Graydon, but when Dorothy comes to visit Millie at work, Mr. Graydon is immediately smitten with her instead ("Ah! Sweet Mystery of Life"/"Falling in Love with Someone"). The two set up a date together. While Millie is brooding over her lost chances, Jimmy breaks in through the window and asks her to dinner. She initially tells him off but then agrees ("I Turned the Corner"/Falling in Love with Someone" (Reprise)).

Back at the Hotel Priscilla, Mrs. Meers along with Ching Ho and Bun Foo get ready to drug Miss Dorothy, when Ching Ho refuses because he loves her. Mrs. Meers stops his ranting by reminding them of why they work for her, to raise money to see their mother again. She convinces them to go along with the plan ("Muqin").

Jimmy finally declares his feelings for Millie while washing dishes to pay their tab at Cafe Society while Muzzy is performing her hit ("Long As I'm Here with You"). Millie is confused by her feelings for Jimmy and her desire not to be poor and initially rejects him. She runs to Muzzy, who tells her she's a fool for throwing away true love for the sake of money. She tells the story of how she met her late husband, a supposedly poor but goodhearted man who gave her a green glass necklace. Regardless of his income status, she loved him anyway, and she later realized that her green glass necklace was actually genuine emerald. Millie reconsiders her feelings and finally realizes that she would rather have a green-glass love with Jimmy ("Gimme, Gimme").

Just as she returns to Jimmy to confess her feelings, they encounter Graydon, who was stood up by Miss Dorothy for their date, and is drunkenly singing, annoying Dexter and his wife, Daphne, who are also on a date. Graydon tells Millie and Jimmy that Mrs. Meers told him Miss Dorothy had checked out of the hotel. When Millie recalls that several other tenants had also suddenly "checked out", and that all of them were orphans, Millie, Jimmy, and Graydon realize what Mrs. Meers is doing. They persuade Muzzy to pose as a new orphan in town to trick Mrs. Meers, who takes the bait, is exposed as the mastermind of the slavery ring, and is then taken to the police station. Meanwhile, Ching Ho had already rescued Miss Dorothy and won her heart.

Jimmy proposes to Millie, and, poor as he is, she accepts, "because if it's marriage I've got in mind, love has everything to do with it." Jimmy turns out to be Herbert J. van Hossmere III, Muzzy's stepson, and one of the most eligible bachelors in the world. And Miss Dorothy turns out to be his sister, an heiress named Dorothy Carnegie Mellon Vanderbilt van Hossmere, and (unlike the 1967 film) she ends up not with the dismayed Trevor Graydon, but with Ching Ho. Muzzy reveals that to help Jimmy and Dorothy avoid getting caught by fortune-hunters, she sent them out into the world so that they could find spouses who weren't in it for the money. Both Jimmy and Dorothy had disguised their family name to avoid being found out as society heirs. In a final pairing, Bun Foo joins Graydon's company as a new stenographer after telling Graydon that he can type fifty words a minute. At the very end of the musical (after the bows), Bun Foo and Ching Ho are once again reunited with their mother ("Curtain Call/Bows").

Principal roles

Cast lists

Notable replacements
 Broadway (2002–04) 
Millie Dillmount: Susan Egan, Catherine Brunell (u/s)
Jimmy Smith: Christian Borle, Cheyenne Jackson (u/s), Darren Ritchie (u/s)
Mrs Meers: Delta Burke, Dixie Carter
Miss Dorothy Brown: Kate Baldwin (u/s), Megan McGinnis (u/s)
Mr Trevor Graydon: Christopher Sieber, Kevin Earley, Cheyenne Jackson (u/s)
Muzzy Van Hossmere: Leslie Uggams
Ching Ho: Francis Jue (u/s)
Lucille: Megan McGinnis

Song list
Songs are by Tesori and Scanlan, unless otherwise noted.

Act I
"Overture" — Orchestra
 "Not for the Life of Me" — Millie 	 	
 "Thoroughly Modern Millie" — Millie & Moderns
 Music by Jimmy Van Heusen and lyrics by Sammy Cahn "Not for the Life of Me (Tag)" — Millie & the Hotel Girls
 "How the Other Half Lives" — Millie & Miss Dorothy
+ "How the Other Half Lives (reprise)" - Millie and Miss Dorothy
 "Not for the Life of Me (Reprise)" — Bun Foo and Ching Ho
 "The Speed Test" — Trevor Graydon, Millie, Stenographers & Office Singers 
 Elements taken from "My eyes are fully open" by Gilbert and Sullivan "They Don't Know" — Mrs. Meers
 "The Nuttycracker Suite" - Orchestra
 Elements taken from Tchaikovsky's Nutcracker Suite "What Do I Need with Love?" - Jimmy
 "Only in New York" — Muzzy
 "Jimmy" — Millie
 Music and lyrics by Jay Thompson 

Act II
"Entr'acte" — Orchestra
"Back at Work"- Millie, Miss Flannery, Women Office Singers
 "Forget About the Boy" — Millie, Miss Flannery, Women Office Singers, Stenographers
 "Ah! Sweet Mystery of Life/Falling in Love with Someone" — Trevor Graydon and Miss Dorothy
 Cover of "Ah! Sweet Mystery of Life" by Victor Herbert
 "I Turned the Corner/Falling in Love with Someone (Reprise)" — Millie, Jimmy, Miss Dorothy, Trevor Graydon 
 "Muqin" — Mrs. Meers, Bun Foo, Ching Ho
 Cover of "My Mammy", music by Walter Donaldson and lyrics by Joe Young and Sam M. Lewis
 "Long as I'm Here with You" — Muzzy & Muzzy's Boys 
 "Gimme Gimme" — Millie
+ "The Speed Test (Reprise)" — Millie, Trevor Graydon, Jimmy
+ "Ah! Sweet Mystery (Reprise)" — Miss Dorothy and Ching Ho
 "Thoroughly Modern Millie (Reprise)" — Jimmy, Miss Dorothy & Moderns
 "Curtain Call/Bows" — Cast 

+ not included in Broadway Cast Recording

An original Broadway cast recording is available on the RCA Victor label.

Productions
Broadway
The musical, directed by Michael Mayer, underwent several workshops in New York in 1999. Included in the workshops casts were Kristin Chenoweth, Marc Kudisch, and Beatrice Arthur.

It then played out-of-town tryouts at the La Jolla Playhouse at University of California, San Diego in October 2000 through December 2000.  Despite nurturing the role through the workshop process, Kristin Chenoweth did not continue with the role of Millie in order to film her own sitcom. She was replaced by Erin Dilly, but prior to public previews, Sutton Foster, her understudy, was chosen to assume the title role, a move that propelled her to stardom.

After a long production history, the musical premiered on Broadway at the Marquis Theatre on April 18, 2002 and closed on June 20, 2004 after 903 performances and 32 previews. Directed by Michael Mayer and choreographed by Rob Ashford, orchestration was by Doug Besterman and the late Ralph Burns, scenic design was by David Gallo, costume design was by Martin Pakledinaz, and lighting design was by Donald Holder. The original cast included Sutton Foster as Millie, Marc Kudisch as Trevor, Angela Christian as Miss Dorothy, Gavin Creel as Jimmy, Harriet Sansom Harris as Mrs. Meers, Sheryl Lee Ralph as Muzzy Van Hossmere, Ken Leung as Ching Ho, Francis Jue as Bun Foo, and Anne L. Nathan as Miss Flannery.

Replacements later in the run included Susan Egan as Millie, Leslie Uggams as Muzzy, Delta Burke and Dixie Carter as Mrs. Meers, Christian Borle as Jimmy, Christopher Sieber as Trevor Graydon, and Liz McCartney as Miss Flannery.  At the April 2, 2003 performance, Meredith Vieira appeared in three minor roles for a segment later broadcast on her daytime talk show The View.

The original Broadway production won six Tony Awards and five Drama Desk Awards, including the win for Best Musical at both award ceremonies.

London

In 2003, the original creative team reunited to stage the show in London's West End at the Shaftesbury Theatre. It began previews on October 11 and opened on October 21. UK TV personality Amanda Holden starred in the title role, with Maureen Lipman and Marti Webb alternating as Mrs. Meers and Sheila Ferguson as Muzzy Van Hossmere. When Webb subsequently left the production to join Tell Me on a Sunday, Mrs. Meers was played by Anita Dobson, and when Holden was forced to take time off due to illness, her understudy Donna Steele took over the role to great acclaim. Despite positive reviews and booking periods extended to January 2005, Thoroughly Modern Millie failed to catch the UK public's attention and closed on June 26, 2004.

UK tour

A UK tour beginning in March 2005 fared much better and successfully toured many of the country's major theatres until November, when it closed as planned in Nottingham. The tour starred Steele as Millie, Lesley Joseph as Mrs. Meers, and Grace Kennedy as Muzzy Van Hossmere.

School edition

The school edition of Thoroughly Modern Millie was premiered at the International Thespian Festival on June 26, 2007. It was presented by the International Thespian Cast. The production starred Elizabeth Elliott as Millie, David King as Jimmy, and Rachel Buethe as Mrs. Meers. The creators of the show also appeared at the festival to help introduce the show.

2017 / 2018 UK Tour

A new UK tour began in January 2016 with direction and choreography by Racky Plews. The tour starred Joanne Clifton as Millie, Michelle Collins as Mrs. Meers (until March 2016) when the role was taken over by Lucas Rush. The tour closed in June 2016.

A 2018 UK tour starring Hayley Tamaddon and directed/choreographed by Racky Plews will start in March 2018 at Richmond Theatre. It will play Eastbourne, Sunderland, Oxford, Torquay, Poole, Stoke, Bradford, Darlington, Southend and Wolverhampton. More dates and further casting TBA.

International productions

A German edition named "Höllisch Moderne Millie" (Infernal Modern Millie) premiered on October 26, 2018 at Hof Theatre.

A Japanese production of Thoroughly Modern Millie will premiere in April 2020 at The Imperial Theatre and go on tour. It will feature Manato Asaka as Millie Dillmount.

Awards and nominations

Original Broadway production

Original London production

Racial stereotyping controversy 
Since the musical became a popular choice for high school productions due to its Tony awards and multiple roles for boys and girls, controversy has arisen about the perceived racial stereotyping of Asian people, resulting in Philadelphia High School for the Creative and Performing Arts student journalists Jasmine Luca and Tai Joselyn referring to the work as "Thoroughly Racist Millie". The subplot of the show in which Mrs. Meers, a white woman, disguises herself as a Chinese woman and runs a white slavery ring with assistance of two recent Chinese male immigrants, Ching Ho and Bun Foo, plays on the close differences between satire and racism. According to the musical play writer, Dick Scanlan, the musical aims to shatter racist stereotypes and allows the audience to experience “the chasm between the stereotype and the real thing”. The original actor for Bun Foo, Francis Jue, also said “this show can be done racist but it doesn’t have to and actually it can actually be anti-racist…And the Chinese guys are the heroes of the story”. A 2020 Encores! production was announced starring Ashley Park in the title role with book revisions by playwright Lauren Yee. The proposed revisions sought to address some of the racist and sexist elements of the show, but the production was canceled due to COVID-19.

See also
 Roaring Twenties
 Human trafficking in China

Notes and references

External links

Information about the show with links to songs and other materials
CurtainUp review
Thoroughly Modern Millie at the Music Theatre International website
 Thoroughly Modern Millie JR. (a version for younger performers) at the Music Theatre International website



Musicals by Jeanine Tesori
2002 musicals
Fiction set in 1922
Broadway musicals
West End musicals
Musicals set in the Roaring Twenties
Musicals based on films
Plays set in New York City
Tony Award for Best Musical
Tony Award-winning musicals
Race-related controversies in theatre
Flappers